John Connolly (born October 21, 1968) is an American musician best known as the guitarist of rock band Sevendust. Connolly is known for his fire designed custom made Les Paul guitar designed by Epiphone, but has since switched to Dean Guitars.

Career

Piece Dogs 
In 1988, John Connolly, with vocalist Greg Anderson, guitarist Mike Grimmett and bassist Kyle Sanders started a band called Piece Dogs in Atlanta, Georgia. In 1992, Piece Dogs released an LP titled Exes for Eyes through Energy Rekords. Connolly was the band's original drummer. The band genre was power and thrash metal. Piece Dogs disbanded several months after releasing the album.

Sevendust 
In 1994, Connolly joined the American heavy metal band Sevendust as a guitarist, and has since been with the band through all of their studio releases.

Projected 
In 2012, Connolly formed the American rock supergroup consisting of Connolly on guitar and lead vocals, fellow Sevendust member Vinnie Hornsby, Alter Bridge and Creed drummer Scott Phillips, and former Submersed and current Tremonti guitarist Eric Friedman. The band released their first album Human in June 2012, before falling into inactivity as members returned to their respective bands in late 2012. The band released their second studio album, Ignite My Insanity, on July 21, 2017.

Personal life 
Connolly married his wife Lori Kirkley on March 24, 2001. John and Lori have been together for 20 years. They have a daughter who goes by the name Jordan, who was born in 2005.

Discography

Piece Dogs 
Exes for Eyes (1992)

Sevendust 
Sevendust (1997)
Home (1999)
Animosity (2001)
Seasons (2003)
Next (2005)
Alpha (2007)
Chapter VII: Hope and Sorrow (2008)
Cold Day Memory (2010)
Black Out the Sun (2013)
Time Travelers & Bonfires (2014)
Kill the Flaw (2015)
All I See Is War (2018)
Blood & Stone (2020)

Projected 
Human (2012)
Ignite My Insanity (2017)
Hypoxia (2022)

Gear

Guitars 
Current
Dean Soltero (USA Custom Shop for John)
Dean Soltero (Japanese Custom Shop)
Dean Black Gold Z
Dean Z '79 Silverback reissue
Dean Z
Dean Stealth Two Tone
Past
Epiphone signature John Connolly Les Paul guitar
Gibson Les Paul Customs (78' and 79')
Gibson Explorer
Gibson Les Paul Studios (83', 91')
Not Sure
12 string Epiphone Les Paul
Yahama acoustic

Effects and more 
Digitech XP-100 Whammy II Wah
Dunlop Uni-Vibe / Wah Controller Pedal
Dunlop DCR-ISR Crybaby Rack Wah
Korg DTR-2 Rack Tuner
Mesa/Boogie Amp Switcher
Rocktron Hush IICX Noise Gate
Shure Wireless
MXR Phase 90
TC Electronic pedals (studio)
Electro-Harmonix (studio)
Dimebag Wah (Dunlop DB01)
Vox Tonelab

Strings 
Dean Markley Blue Steel strings

References

External links 
 Sevendust – Official Sevendust website
 IMDB.com

Living people
American heavy metal guitarists
American heavy metal drummers
Musicians from Atlanta
Nu metal drummers
1968 births
American heavy metal singers
Guitarists from Georgia (U.S. state)
American male guitarists
20th-century American drummers
American male drummers
20th-century American guitarists
Sevendust members
Projected members
20th-century American male musicians